Chimaobinna Enyiakanwanne Onyele (born 6. November 1972, in Frankfurt, Germany), known by the stagename Chima ([t͡ʃiːma]) is a German singer based in Frankfurt. A member of Brothers Keepers, since 2012 he has recorded as a solo artist for Universal Music.

Life 
Chima's parents moved in the 1960th from Nigeria to Germany. He was born in 1972 in Frankfurt, where he graduated from the Ernst-Reuter-School. Afterwards he has studied Sociology.

Discography
Albums:
 2002: Reine Glaubenssache
 2005: Im Rahmen der Möglichkeiten
 2012: Stille
 2014: Von Steinen und Elefanten

Singles: 
 2001: Ich leb das
 2002: Lass los
 2005: Wundervoll
 2006: Immer noch
 2012: Morgen
 2012: Ausflug ins Blaue
 2012: Fliegen
 2014: 100 Elefanten
 2014: Das große Schweigen (exclusive on Spotify)

References

1972 births
Living people
21st-century German male singers
Musicians from Frankfurt